Cycloramphus ohausi is a species of frog in the family Cycloramphidae. It is endemic to Serra dos Órgãos in southeastern Brazil. The specific name ohausi honors Friedrich Ohaus, a German physicist and herpetologist. Common name Wandolleck's button frog has been proposed for this species.

Cycloramphus ohausi is a forest species associated with streams. The known range is protected by the Serra dos Órgãos National Park. The reason for the apparent decline could be chytridiomycosis.

References

ohausi
Frogs of South America
Amphibians of Brazil
Endemic fauna of Brazil
Amphibians described in 1907
Taxonomy articles created by Polbot